Jhang is a city in Punjab, Pakistan.

Jhang may also refer to:
 Jhang Tehsil, a tehsil in Pakistan
 Jhang District, a District in Pakistan
 New Jhang, a village in Pakistan
 Jhang Railway Station, a railway station in Jhang
 Zhang (surname), an East Asian surname

See also

 Jhang Branch, a canal in Pakistan